The 1987 World Table Tennis Championships men's singles was the 39th edition of the men's singles championship. 

Jiang Jialiang defeated Jan-Ove Waldner in the final, winning three sets to one to secure the title.

Results

See also
List of World Table Tennis Championships medalists

References

-